The Church of la Asunción (Spanish: Iglesia de la Asunción) is a church located in Albacete, Spain. It was declared Bien de Interés Cultural in 1982.

References 

Churches in Castilla–La Mancha
Bien de Interés Cultural landmarks in the Province of Albacete
Buildings and structures in Albacete